Grudziądz County is a unit of territorial administration and local government (powiat) in Kuyavian-Pomeranian Voivodeship, north-central Poland. It came into being on January 1, 1999, as a result of the Polish local government reforms passed in 1998. Its administrative seat is the city of Grudziądz, although the city is not part of the county (it constitutes a separate city county).

As of 2019 its total population is 40,181, out of which the population of Łasin is 3,254, that of Radzyń Chełmiński is 1,847, and the rural population is 35,080.

Neighbouring counties
Apart from the city of Grudziądz, Grudziądz County is also bordered by Kwidzyn County to the north, Iława County, Nowe Miasto County and Brodnica County to the east, Wąbrzeźno County to the south, and Chełmno County and Świecie County to the west.

Administrative division
The county is subdivided into six gminas (two urban-rural and four rural). These are listed in the following table, in descending order of population.

References

Polish official population figures 2006

 
Land counties of Kuyavian-Pomeranian Voivodeship